Essen-Kupferdreh station is located in the district of Kupferdreh of the city of Essen in the German state of North Rhine-Westphalia. It is on the Wuppertal-Vohwinkel–Essen-Überruhr line and is classified by Deutsche Bahn as a category 5 station. It was built between 1969 and 1979, replacing the nearby Old Kupferdreh station. In the 2010–12 period, the track near the station was elevated and the side platforms were replaced by an island platform.

The station is served by the RE49 Regional-Express service, known as the Wupper-Lippe-Express, every 60 minutes, and S-Bahn line S 9 (Recklinghausen / Haltern – Gladbeck - Bottrop - Essen - Wuppertal - Hagen), operating every 30 minutes during the day.

It is also served by bus route 141 operated by Verkehrsgesellschaft Ennepe-Ruhr at 30-minute intervals during the day. It is also served by bus routes 155, 177 and 180, operated by Ruhrbahn at 20- or 30-minute intervals during the day.

Notes

Rhine-Ruhr S-Bahn stations
S9 (Rhine-Ruhr S-Bahn)
Kupferdreh
Railway stations in Germany opened in 1969